The NHL on Versus was a presentation of National Hockey League (NHL) games broadcast on Versus. Versus became the NHL's cable partner in the United States beginning in the 2005–06 season from previous partner ESPN, providing coverage of regular season games, playoff games, and select games from the Stanley Cup Finals.

Before the beginning of the 2011–12 season, Comcast—the owners of Versus—acquired a majority stake in NBC Universal, the parent company of NBC—the NHL's current American broadcast television partner. As a result of this merger and the impending relaunch of Versus as the NBC Sports Network in 2012, all NHL telecasts on Versus became NHL on NBC telecasts beginning in the 2011–12 season.

History

The NHL's television deal with Versus was made at the conclusion of the 2004–05 NHL lockout that caused the cancellation of an entire season. At the time, Versus offered a two-year, US$130 million contract (with a network option for a third year) that delivered guaranteed money for Commissioner Gary Bettman (ESPN, which previously held the rights and broadcast games on ESPN National Hockey Night, wanted a revenue-sharing deal similar to NBC's). Versus was expected to use NHL coverage to show it was a legitimate suitor for Major League Baseball and National Football League packages that were to be negotiated later in 2005, but they did not land agreements with either league. In 2007, the NHL signed an agreement to extend the NHL on Versus to the 2010–2011 season. Versus paid $72.5 million for 2007–2008 and will pay inflationary increases over the next three years.

In 2011, Comcast acquired a majority stake in NBC Universal. In April, NBCUniversal announced that it had reached a 10-year deal to unify the broadcast and cable rights to the NHL, in a contract valued at $2 billion. The deal would maintain and/or expand most of the existing broadcast arrangements on both networks, with Versus carrying 90 regular season games per-season, playoff games (with other NBCUniversal channels such as USA Network available as overflow for national broadcasts of all playoff games), and games 3 and 4 of the Stanley Cup. It was also stated that Versus would be rebranded under the NBC Sports name to reflect its integration of the division, later revealed to be NBC Sports Network.

As part of the transition to NBCSN (which officially launched on January 1, 2012), the NHL on Versus branding was dropped from NHL telecasts on Versus beginning in the 2011–12 season, with all games now carrying the NHL on NBC branding and production.

Coverage overview
The network broadcast at least 54 games during the regular season (usually two games per week, sometimes three or just one), plus the All-Star Game, Skills Competition, and YoungStars game.

At the end of the season, the network would have blanket coverage of the playoffs, culminating in the first two games of the Stanley Cup Finals. Versus also showed the NHL Awards Show and first round of the NHL Draft (both a simulcast from Canadian television).

Versus scheduled a few doubleheaders during the regular season (consisting of a game in the Eastern Time Zone or Central Time Zone, and then a Mountain or Pacific Time Zone game). Playoff coverage usually involved doubleheaders throughout the first two rounds, except weekends prior to 2007–08, when NBC often televised multiple games during its broadcast windows.

Much of the framework of the Versus deal continued to be the basis of NBCSN's coverage.

The "Game of the Week"
In the 2006–07 season, Versus began to carry an exclusive national "game of the week"; the games were typically scheduled on Monday nights, though aired on Tuesday nights during the National Football League season in defense of Monday Night Football. No other broadcaster could carry an NHL game during the window, although the league stated that it would try to arrange its schedule in future seasons so that few other games would be played during the window 

Games featured in the broadcasts usually focused on matchups between American teams. Traditionally ratings-friendly teams such as the New York Rangers, Detroit Red Wings, and Boston Bruins, the Buffalo Sabres and Pittsburgh Penguins (which typically have high local viewership), along with the Comcast-owned Philadelphia Flyers, were also regularly, frequently at or near the maximum of nine appearances per team during the regular season.

Hockey Central and NHL Live
Versus also provided postgame coverage after every game they broadcast. The postgame show was initially known as Hockey Central, airing from their Stamford, Connecticut studios. Beginning in the 2011–12 season, the program was renamed NHL Live, and began incorporating NHL on NBC personalities.

Playoff coverage
During the playoffs, Versus' first-round and second-round games could have been subject to blackout in the participating teams' regional markets (although they have exclusivity for two second-round games per series). Versus regained full national coverage for its Conference and Stanley Cup Final telecasts. Some telecasts were sourced from Canadian broadcasters, including CBC's Hockey Night in Canada and the NHL on TSN.

In 2007, Canadians accused the NHL of giving the CBC second billing to Versus' coverage of the playoffs.

From the 2011–2012 season through the 2020–2021 season, NBC Sports and NBCSN had exclusive rights to the entire Stanley Cup playoffs starting in round 2 (Conference Semifinals), and non-exclusive rights for the first round (Conference Quarterfinals), and would air each game nationally.

Ratings
Versus had about 20 million fewer subscribers than ESPN when the NHL started on Versus, but its owner Comcast switched Versus from a digital tier to basic cable to make NHL games available to more cable subscribers as well as re-branded the network (which was then known as the Outdoor Life Network) as a sports network. For Versus, the NHL coverage was a good addition as Versus' ratings grew by about 275% when it showed an NHL game.

2005–06
Versus' games rated substantially higher than any non-Tour de France programming that Versus had ever aired in comparable timeslots (rating between 0.2 and 0.3 during the regular season). Still, these numbers were quite small compared to ratings for most other sports on national cable channels reaching at least as many homes as Versus.

Versus' playoff viewership did not increase as much as it or the league might have hoped. Versus reached a viewership of 610,836 households for Game 1 of the 2006 Stanley Cup Finals. This figure was 39% fewer households than what ESPN drew for the Stanley Cup series opener two years earlier (though ESPN has a larger reach than Versus). Game 2 was seen in slightly fewer households (605,501).

2006–07
Versus averaged a 0.2 Nielsen Media Research household rating, about level with the 2005–06 regular season NHL numbers and its 2006 prime time average.

Versus' coverage of the 2007 All-Star Game garnered a .7 rating (474,298 viewing homes and 672,948 total viewers). Ratings were down 76% from ABC's ratings in 2004, the last time the game was played, and down 82% from ABC's coverage in 2000. However, some of that significant drop can be attributed to the game being played on a weeknight (Wednesday) as opposed to the traditional weekend game, and the fact that Versus is a cable television network unlike ABC which is a broadcast network. The 2008 All-Star Game was scheduled for a Sunday.

2007–08
In 2007–08, NHL audiences on Versus in the United States remained small, but increased over the previous two seasons. Versus averaged 246,154 viewers a game, up 24 percent from the previous year. Over the year, channel distribution increased to 73.6 million households from 70.8 million. Conference Finals ratings were averaging a 1.2 HH rating. Game 2 between the Flyers and Penguins drew a 1.7 HH rating, 2.3 million viewers; an NHL record on Versus.

References

External links
 
 The Suitor Tutor, Part 1: On VERSUS and NBC, How Have They Done, and Where the Merger Will Take Them
The Suitor Tutor's Fang Forecheck: On NBC and VERSUS
NHL on VERSUS: Have they finally figured out what fans want?
 Sports Media Watch: NHL on Versus
Versus
 A Little Patience with VERSUS Changes … For Now
 NBC, Versus have inside track on NHL deal
 Great hockey, yes, but is anyone watching? 

2000s American television series
2005 American television series debuts
2011 American television series endings
Versus
American sports television series
NBCSN shows